Espi Rud (also Romanized as Espī Rūd) is a village in Kelarabad Rural District, Kelarabad District, Abbasabad County, Mazandaran Province, Iran. At the 2006 census, its population was 108, in 32 families.

See also 
 Kelarestaq

References 

Populated places in Abbasabad County